litterbug is a Canadian indie rock band formed in 1999 in Vancouver by Marc Simao and Janie Cranfield.

Overview 
Formed in Vancouver in 1999, litterbug has had numerous line up changes, while maintaining its two original members. In 2002 the band released its debut album pablo on its own record label monkey-bar-records gaining positive reviews. A second full-length album kaiser and EP hollis followed in 2004. In 2004 litterbug recorded "oh, you are so beautiful" for a CBC Radio 3 session, which appears on the New Music Canada compilation New Music Canada, Vol. 1. litterbug has appeared on two other CJSR compilations: Ralph Nader Was Here released in 2003, and Get Out of Your Basement released in 2007.

Both Marc and Janie moved the band to Vancouver, British Columbia in late 2005, and in the Fall of 2006, Spencer Rose and Amelia Mori joined the band to work on new material. litterbug released zero hour in 2009. Amelia left for medical school in Australia and Spencer left, both in 2009. Stewart Lampe and Mouki Butt joined the band. Litterbug is working on new material for a followup to zero hour.

Style 
Some commentators have compared litterbug's style to artists such as Yo La Tengo, Half Japanese, The Feelies, Danielson Family,  and The Velvet Underground. Marc Simao of litterbug also credits punk pioneers like Jonathan Richman and Patti Smith.

Comprising both musical neophytes and veterans since litterbug's inception, band members have contributed to songs using a wide range of instruments.

Discography

Albums

Compilations

References

External links 
 Litterbug Official Band website
 litterbug at MySpace
 Litterbug article from Vue Weekly
 litterbug Profile at CBC Radio 3

Musical groups established in 1999
Musical groups from Vancouver
Canadian indie pop groups
1999 establishments in British Columbia